Rim of the Canyon is a 1949 American Western film directed by John English and starring and co-produced by Gene Autry; featuring Nan Leslie, and Thurston Hall. Based on the short story Phantom .45's Talk Loud by Joseph Chadwick, the film is about a horse stolen by escaped convicts and the cowboy who pursues them to a ghost town inhabited by a ghost.

Cast
 Gene Autry as Gene Autry / Marshal Steve Autry
 Champion as Champ, Gene's horse
 Nan Leslie as Ruth Lambert
 Thurston Hall as Big Tim Hanlon
 Clem Bevans as Loco John
 Walter Sande as Jake Fargo
 Jock Mahoney as Pete Reagan
 Francis McDonald as Charlie Lewis
 Alan Hale Jr. as Matt Kimbrough

Production

Filming and budget
Rim of the Canyon was filmed December 6–20, 1948. The film had an operating budget of $46,784 (equal to $ today).

Filming locations
 Vasquez Rocks, Vasquez Rocks Natural Area Park, 10700 W. Escondido Canyon Rd., Agua Dulce, California, USA
 Corriganville Movie Ranch, Simi Valley, California, USA

Soundtracks
 "You're the Only Star in My Blue Heaven" (Gene Autry) by Gene Autry
 "Rim of the Canyon" (Hy Heath, Johnny Lange) by Gene Autry

References
Citations

Bibliography

External links
 
 
 
 

1949 films
1949 Western (genre) films
American black-and-white films
Films set in ghost towns
Films based on short fiction
Columbia Pictures films
American Western (genre) films
Films directed by John English
1940s English-language films
1940s American films